Paul Put (born 26 May 1956) is a Belgian football coach who manages Congo.

Career
Put was manager of the Gambian national team between 2008 and 2011, before being appointed as manager of Burkina Faso in March 2012. He had previously managed Belgian club sides Geel, Lokeren and Lierse, before being banned for three-years by the Royal Belgian Football Association for his alleged involvement in the Ye Zheyun match-fixing scandal.

Put left his role as Burkina Faso manager in February 2015, before becoming manager of Jordan in June 2015. Following a two-week suspension by the Jordan Football Association on 20 December 2015, Put resigned his position as manager of the Jordan national team in January 2016. He was shortlisted for the Guinea national team job in July 2016.

On 30 October 2016 he was announced as manager of Algerian club USM Alger, on a two-year contract. In February 2017 he was one of a number of managers on the shortlist for the vacant Rwanda national team manager role. He became the manager of the Kenyan national team in November 2017, before resigning in February 2018.

He became manager of Chinese club Xinjiang Tianshan Leopard later that month, signing a three-year contract. In March 2018 he was appointed manager of the Guinea national team. He was sacked in July 2019, and received a lifetime ban by the Guinea Football Federation in August 2019.

On 1 October 2019, Put was appointed sporting director of Wydad Casablanca.

In October 2020, he was appointed by Bangladeshi top flight club Saif SC as their new head coach.  He resigned in February 2021.

He became manager of Congo in May 2021.

References

External links

 Paul Put Interview

1956 births
Living people
People from Merksem
Sportspeople from Antwerp
Royale Union Saint-Gilloise players
Belgian football managers
K.S.C. Lokeren Oost-Vlaanderen managers
Lierse S.K. managers
Royal Excel Mouscron managers
Gambia national football team managers
Burkina Faso national football team managers
Jordan national football team managers
USM Alger managers
Kenya national football team managers
Xinjiang Tianshan Leopard F.C. managers
Guinea national football team managers
Saif SC managers
Congo national football team managers
Belgian Pro League managers
Algerian Ligue Professionnelle 1 managers
China League One managers
Bangladesh Football Premier League managers
2013 Africa Cup of Nations managers
2015 Africa Cup of Nations managers
2019 Africa Cup of Nations managers
Belgian expatriate football managers
Belgian expatriate sportspeople in the Gambia
Belgian expatriate sportspeople in Burkina Faso
Belgian expatriate sportspeople in Jordan
Belgian expatriate sportspeople in Algeria
Belgian expatriate sportspeople in Kenya
Belgian expatriate sportspeople in China
Belgian expatriate sportspeople in Guinea
Belgian expatriate sportspeople in Morocco
Belgian expatriate sportspeople in Bangladesh
Belgian expatriate sportspeople in the Republic of the Congo
Expatriate football managers in the Gambia
Expatriate football managers in Burkina Faso
Expatriate football managers in Jordan
Expatriate football managers in Algeria
Expatriate football managers in Kenya
Expatriate football managers in China
Expatriate football managers in Guinea
Expatriate football managers in Bangladesh
Expatriate football managers in the Republic of the Congo